Benazzi is a surname. Notable people with the surname include:

Abdelatif Benazzi (born 1968), French-Moroccan rugby union player
Mario Benazzi (1902–1997), Italian zoologist
Vágner Benazzi (born 1954), Brazilian footballer and manager